Uno is a video game based on the card game of the same name. It has been released for a number of platforms. The Xbox 360 version by Carbonated Games and Microsoft Game Studios was released on May 9, 2006, as a digital download via Xbox Live Arcade. A version for iPhone OS and iPod devices was released in 2008 by Gameloft. Gameloft released the PlayStation 3 version on October 1, 2009, and also released a version for WiiWare, Nintendo DSi via DSiWare, and PlayStation Portable. An updated version developed by Ubisoft Chengdu and published by Ubisoft was released for the PlayStation 4 and Xbox One in August 2016, the Microsoft Windows in December 2016 and for the Nintendo Switch in November 2017.

Uno's original version was well received by critics. A sequel to the game's original version, Uno Rush, was announced at E3 2008 and released on 2009.

Gameplay 
Uno is a video game that takes similarities to the card game of the same name. For the official rules, see the rules of the physical version.

Differences between versions

Xbox 360 version 

The Xbox 360 version of the game offers three different game modes including Standard Uno, Partner Uno, and House Rules Uno.  In Partner Uno, players sitting across from each other join forces to form a team, so that a win by either player is a win for the team.  In House Rules Uno, the rules can be tweaked and customized to the player's preference.

The Xbox 360 version of Uno offers multiplayer for up to four players through Xbox Live.  Players can join or drop-out of in-progress games at any time, with computer players automatically taking over for any missing humans. The game supports the Xbox Live Vision camera, allowing opponents to view an image of the player (or whatever the camera is pointed at) while playing the game.

Theme decks 
The Xbox 360 version of Uno supports downloadable content through the Xbox Live Marketplace. This content takes the form of custom theme decks, which feature new visual appearances, sound effects, and game rules. Decks available for download from the Xbox Live Marketplace include:
 Project Gotham Racing Uno: In this deck, the cards feature pictures of the cars seen in the Project Gotham Racing series of video games. The rule changes include a card called the "Gotham Live" card, which is based on the replay feature in Project Gotham Racing 3. This card allows a player to look at the hand of any of the other players as well as functioning as a normal wild card.
 Kameo: Elements of Power Uno: A custom deck with artwork from Kameo: Elements of Power. In addition, a special play card allows a player to swap his or her entire hand with the hand of any other player in the game.
 Uno 35th Anniversary: A special deck made to celebrate the 35th Anniversary of the first edition of Uno released in the United States in 1971. In this deck, there are specialty "35" cards. If a "35" card is played, only a 3 or 5 of any color can be played.
 Super Street Fighter II Turbo HD Remix: This deck commemorates the release of Super Street Fighter II Turbo HD Remix, it only has one background and one music track.  Additionally, a new card named "Hadouken" was added.  When played, the targeted player must draw cards until they get a Skip or a Reverse card.

Gameloft versions
The iPod version by Gameloft features a 15-round progressive career mode that introduces and unlocks special rule changes as the player progresses through the game.

The WiiWare version, as well as the DSiWare version, supported online play via the discontinued Nintendo Wi-Fi Connection, as well as Wii Speak support in the WiiWare version.

Gameloft developed and published Uno & Friends in 2013 as an online experience on Facebook and other platforms. The game was discontinued in 2017.

Ubisoft version
The Ubisoft version of the game, which is available for Xbox One, PlayStation 4, Microsoft Windows, Nintendo Switch, and Stadia, has two different modes; Standard Play, which is a standard four-player game of Uno; and a 2v2 Mode where one can partner up with another player. Both of these modes support online play. This version also has six different house rules that can be combined.

House Rules in Ubisoft Uno 
Stacking: One player can STACK Draw 2 OR wild Draw 4 Card to pass the effect to the other player.
7 - 0: The 7 card lets someone choose who to swap hands with. The 0 card makes EVERYONE Swap hands with each other, in which ever way the game is being played in (clockwise or counter clockwise!)
Jump-In (Ubisoft Connect): Lets a player play their card out of their turn if the card is IDENTICAL to the one in the Discard Pile.
Force Play: When someone Draws a Card that matches the Color, Number, Or Symbol, they MUST Play it.
No Bluffing: Disables Challenging Wild Draw 4 Cards.
Draw to Match: Makes a Player Draw cards until they draw a card that matches the Color, Number, Or Symbol.

Theme decks 
In addition to the regular Uno deck, there are also custom theme decks including new visual appearances, sound effects, and game rules. Most of them are available by downloadable content either individually or as an Ultimate Edition bundle. These include:

Uno Winter Theme: This is purely cosmetic and adds a winter theme to the backdrop while still retaining the original Uno card deck. This pack is available as separate free DLC.
Uno Rabbids: A custom deck starring the Raving Rabbids, this deck has four unique cards (Comin' Through, Explosive Results, Hurry Up!, and Wild Blue Yonder). This pack is included with the base game.
Uno Just Dance: A custom deck based on Just Dance 2017, this deck has four unique cards (Cross-Fade, Hot Number, Get Down, and Just Dance Machine). This pack is available as separate paid DLC.
Uno Rayman: A custom deck based on the Rayman series of games, this deck has four unique cards (Dragon, Punching Things, Escape, and A Little Help). This pack is available as separate paid DLC.
Uno Flip: A custom deck featuring double-sided cards and different action cards (Draw 5, Skip Everyone, Wild Draw Color, and Flip) based on the physical card game of the same name introduced by Mattel in 2019. This pack is available as separate paid DLC.
Uno Fenyx's Quest: A custom deck based on Immortals Fenyx Rising, this deck has two unique action cards (Typhon's Trick and Fenyx Power), 4 passive abilities based on the cursed gods (Hephaistos, Athena, Aphrodite, and Ares), and Typhon's Curse which forces you to draw one if you don't discard a cursed card. This pack is available as separate paid DLC.
Uno 50th Anniversary: A custom deck to celebrate UNO's 50th Anniversary, this deck has black cards with the numbers and symbols as the color of the card, and has a Wild 50/50 card that when played the person picks 2 players to assign to heads or tails (50 or UNO logo), then a coin flip starts, the loser of the coin flip has to draw 4 cards (just like a Wild +4 card played). This pack is available as separate paid DLC.
Uno The Call Of Yara: A custom deck based on Far Cry 6 with characters from the game and a special Wild Guerrilla Radio card which helps or hinders the players when played. This pack is available as separate paid DLC.

Mattel163 version 
The Mattel163 version of the game is a new mobile version of the tabletop game UNO Cards.

This version has the following 4 modes: the classic mode, 2 Vs 2 mode, custom room mode, go wild mode. The game can be played on Ios, Android, and Facebook H5 pages.
The first Closed beta test of UNO! Mobile started in Canada via Google Play Store on the 6th of February, 2018. Before the soft launch of UNO! Mobile on mid-2018, it took the studio about 12 months to take the game into vast players. The development process of UNO! Mobile was done by Mattel 163 and supported by ThunderFire UX team.

Development and release

Original version 
The Xbox 360 version was also included as a download code in the Xbox Live Vision bundle.

Ubisoft version 
An updated version developed by Ubisoft Chengdu and published by Ubisoft was released for Xbox One and PlayStation 4 in August 2016, with a Steam version to follow later in the year. On November 7, 2017, Uno was released for the Nintendo Switch. The game was also released for the Stadia cloud gaming service, operated by Google, on September 15, 2020. A version for Amazon Luna followed on December 10, 2020.

Downloadable content

Reception

Uno's original version was well received by critics. It holds an 82% average review score on the now defunct review aggregator website GameRankings. On Metacritic, it holds a 81 score out of 100, based on critic reviews, and indicating "generally favorable reviews". However, its Ubisoft version received mixed reviews from critics, with the PlayStation 4 version receiving a 71 out of 100 score, based on 11 critic reviews, the Xbox One version receiving a 57 out of 100 score, based on 8 critic reviews, and the Nintendo Switch version receiving a 69 out of 100 score, based on 7 critic reviews, with both them indicating "mixed or average reviews".

Sales 
On March 27, 2007, Microsoft declared Uno to be the first Xbox Live Arcade game to exceed one million downloads. As of 2011, the game sold at least 2.068 million copies.

Notes

References

External links
 Carbonated Games official website

Uno (card game) video games
2006 video games
Android (operating system) games
DSiWare games
Gameloft games
IOS games
IPod games
Microsoft games
PlayStation Portable games
PlayStation 3 games
PlayStation Network games
Video games developed in France
Video games developed in China
Video games developed in the United States
Video games with cross-platform play
Wii games
Wii Speak games
WiiWare games
Xbox 360 Live Arcade games
Games for Windows certified games
Windows Phone games
Xbox One games
PlayStation 4 games
Ubisoft games
Stadia games